The Munster Intermediate Club Hurling Championship (known for sponsorship reasons as the AIB Munster GAA Hurling Intermediate Club Championship) is an annual hurling competition organised by the Munster Council of the Gaelic Athletic Association and contested by the champion intermediate clubs in the province of Munster in Ireland. It is the most prestigious competition for intermediate clubs in Munster hurling.

The Munster Intermediate Club Championship was introduced in 2003. In its current format, the championship begins in late October or early November and is usually played over a four-week period. The six participating club teams compete in a straight knockout competition that culminates with the Munster final for the two remaining teams. The winner of the Munster Intermediate Championship, as well as being presented with the Hoare Cup, qualifies for the subsequent All-Ireland Club Championship.
 
The competition has been won by 19 teams, however, no team has ever won the championship on more than one occasion. Cork clubs have accumulated the highest number of victories with 7 wins. Kilmoyley's win in the 2021 championship was the first for a Kerry club meaning clubs from all six counties have won at least one title.

Kilmoyley are the reigning champions, having beaten Courcey Rovers by 0-24 to 0-21 in the 2021 final.

Format

Overview
The Munster Championship is a single elimination tournament. Each team is afforded only one defeat before being eliminated from the championship. Pairings for matches are drawn at random and there is no seeding.

Each match is played as a single leg. If a match is drawn there is a period of extra time, however, if both sides are still level at the end of extra time a replay takes place and so on until a winner is found.

Competition format
Quarter-final: Four teams contest this round. The two winning teams advance directly to the semi-final stage. The two losing teams are eliminated from the championship.

Semi-finals: Four teams contest this round. The two winning teams advance directly to the final. The two losing teams are eliminated from the championship.

Final: The final is contested by the two semi-final winners.

Teams

Qualification
The Munster GAA Hurling All-Ireland Intermediate Club Championship features six teams in the final tournament. 87 teams contest the six county club championships with the six respective champions automatically qualifying for the Munster series.

List of Finals

Roll of Honour

Performances by county

Records and statistics

Teams

County representatives

Top scorers

All time

By year

Single game

Finals

References

 2